The Zion Plovdiv Synagogue  is a synagogue in the city of Plovdiv located in Bulgaria. This synagogue is one of the only 2 synagogues that remain active to this day in Bulgaria (with the Sofia Synagogue).

History
According to the archaeological research a Synagogue had been constructed in ancient Philippopolis dating back to the reign of
Emperor Alexander Severus in the first half of 3rd century AD. It is followed by several renovations, the last one – from the beginning of 5th century (M. Martinova). In 1360, when the city was conquered by the Turks certain Jews who emigrated from Aragon in 1492 settled in Philippopolis and built a synagogue called "K. K. Aragon," which was standing in 1540, but is no longer in existence. In 1892 following Bulgaria liberation from Ottoman domination in 1878 one of the first synagogues to be erected was the (Zion) Synagogue in Plovdiv. It was built in the remnants of a small courtyard in what was once a large Jewish quarter called Orta Mezar during the Turkish rule. The location of the Sephardic synagogue is now called Tsar Kaloyan Street 13. Before the Second World War, the Jewish quarter had a population of 7000. The Synagogue is one of the best-preserved examples of the so-called "Ottoman-style" synagogues in the Balkans. According to author Ruth E. Gruber, the interior is a "hidden treasure…a glorious, if run-down, burst of color." An exquisite Venetian glass chandelier hangs from the center of the ceiling, which has a richly painted dome. All surfaces are covered in elaborate, Moorish-style, geometric designs in once-bright greens and blues. Torah scrolls are kept in the gilded Aron-ha-Kodesh.

In 1904 the Jewish community possessed three other synagogues: Jeshurun, built in 1710 according to the inscription on a marble slab in the synagogue; Ahabat-Shalom, built in 1880; Shebeṭ Aḥim or Mafṭirim, founded in 1882 by emigrants from Karlovo, whence the Jews fled during the Turko-Russian war (1877-1878).

Rabbis
Since the end of the eighteenth century the following have been chief rabbis of the city:
 Abraham Sidi (according to Zedner, l.c. p. 397, "Sa'id"; 1790-1810);
 Judah Sidi (1810–12), brother of the preceding, and author of Ot Emet, on the laws relating to reading the Torah, Salonica, 1799; and of Ner Miẓwah, on Maimonides' Yad and his Sefer ha-Miẓwot, with indexes to the hermeneutic works of Solomon and Israel Jacob Algazi, ib. 1810-11;
 Abraham ibn Aroglio (1812–19);
 Abraham Ventura (1823–29);
 Moses ha-Levi (1830–32);
 Jacob Finzi (1832–33);
 Ḥayyim ibn Aroglio (1833–57), with Abraham ibn Aroglio joint author of Mayim ha-Ḥayyim'', responsa, Salonica, 1846;
 Moses Behmoiras (1857–76); Ḥayyim Meborah (1876-92);
 Ezra Benaroyo who has held office since 1892.
 Shmuel Behar

Legacy
Nowadays, the Jewish community in Bulgaria is very small (863 in 1994) because of the Holocaust, secularity of the local Jewish population due to many years of communism and subsequent Aliya (Jewish immigration to Israel).

In 1994 the synagogue was mostly inactive. but the community is undergoing a revival 
In 2003 the  synagogue was  restored. The city's mayor, the U.S. and Israeli ambassadors to Bulgaria, were present at its  inauguration.
The funding for the restoration of the 19th-century Zion Synagogue. was raised by the U.S. Commission for the Preservation of America's Heritage Abroad (US$26,000) and the
London-based Hanadiv Charitable Foundation.

The Plovdiv synagogue is open on Friday night services and on High Holidays. Zion synagogue is also available for guests during the day only after a prescheduled visit made from the temple's website. The synagogue hosts various events connected with the cultural and educational program of the city.

A permanent exhibition about the Jewish life in the city and the region will soon be created and it will present different objects and stories from the community in Plovdiv and Bulgaria.

Photo gallery

See also
 Plovdiv
 Sofia Synagogue
 History of the Jews in Bulgaria
 List of synagogues in Bulgaria

References

Synagogue
Sephardi Jewish culture in Bulgaria
Ottoman architecture in Bulgaria
Tourist attractions in Plovdiv
Synagogues in Bulgaria
Romaniote synagogues
Sephardi synagogues
Synagogue